

The Vickers F.B.14 was a British two-seat fighter/reconnaissance biplane designed and built by Vickers Limited. About 100 were built for the Royal Flying Corps but saw only limited use as it was designed for a larger engine which was not available when production commenced and it did not meet performance expectations.

Design and development
The F.B.14 was a conventional single-bay biplane with two tandem open cockpits and a fixed tailskid landing gear. It was designed to use a new engine, the 230 hp (170 kW) BHP inline engine (later to become the Siddeley Puma). The steel-tube airframe was completed in mid-1916, but the engine was not ready and it was fitted with a 160 hp (120 kW) Beardmore engine instead. The aircraft was underpowered with the Beardmore engine and suffered reliability problems and over 50 production aircraft were delivered to the Royal Flying Corps without engines. A more reliable engine was tested, but the 120 hp (90 kW) Beardmore did not help meet the performance required. Attempts to fit alternate engines resulted in a number of variants with the most successful being a Rolls-Royce Eagle IV Vee engine. The aircraft performance was inferior to the contemporary Bristol F.2B, however, and further development of the F.B.14 was abandoned.

The F.B.14 saw limited operational use, with some being sent to Mesopotamia, with seven being used in home defence squadrons. The Rolls-Royce powered F.B.14D, while being used for testing of an experimental gunsight at Orfordness on 22 July 1917, engaged in a German air raid and claimed an unconfirmed shoot-down of a Gotha bomber off Zeebrugge.

Variants
F.B.14
Production aircraft powered by a 160 hp (120 kW) Beardmore engine, 104 built by Vickers at Weybridge.
F.B.14A
Re-engined with a 150 hp (110 kW) Lorraine-Dietrich Vee engine, one built.
F.B.14D
Re-engined with a 250 hp (190 kW) Rolls-Royce Eagle IV engine and fitted with increased span two-bay wings.
F.B.14F
Re-engined with a 150 hp (112 kW) RAF 4a air-cooled V-12 engine.

Operators

Royal Flying Corps

Specifications (F.B.14)

See also

References

External links

1910s British fighter aircraft
F.B.14
Aircraft first flown in 1916